Bhabhi is a 1957 Hindi film directed by Krishnan–Panju for AVM Productions. It starred Balraj Sahni, Pandari Bai and Nanda in pivotal roles.

The film went on to become the eighth highest grossing Bollywood film of the year. The film was a remake of the 1954 Bengali film Banga Gora, which in turn was based on the novel Bijila by Prabhavathi Devi Saraswathi. The Bengali movie was earlier remade in Tamil as Kula Dheivam and later remade in Kannada as Jenu Goodu. Pandari Bai reprised her role in all versions except Bengali.

Summary
Although a graduate in Arts, Shanta (Pandari Bai) agrees to marry a less educated widowed businessman Ratanlal (Balraj Sahni), shortly called Ratan, who has a son Mithu (Daisy Irani), from his first marriage and re-locates to live with him, his three brothers; Ramesh (Jawahar Kaul), Rajan (Raja Gosavi) and Baldev (Jagdeep) and his aunty (Durga Khote). Ratanlal permits Shanta to let her child-widowed sister, Lata (Nanda), to also live with them. Shanta soon earns the respect and love of everyone in the family. Ramesh marries Tara (Shyama), the daughter of Advocate Motilal (Bipin Gupta), while Rajan marries Mangala (Nalini Chonkar), the daughter of Munshiram (Shivraj). After these marriages, misunderstandings crop up, generally generated by Mangala, so much so that Tara joins forces with her, forcing the brothers to separate from each other, with Ratanlal dividing the property and business equally amongst them, and re-locating in a small village house, while Ramesh now lives with Tara and her brother, Jeevan (Anwar Hussain) and his wife. Rajan does not get along with Mangala, takes to alcohol in a big way, stops his medical studies and joins the army and Baldev re-locates to Bombay. The question remains: will this troubled family ever be re-united during their respective lifetimes?

Cast
 Balraj Sahni as Ratanlal "Ratan"
 Pandari Bai as Shanta 
 Nanda as Lata
 Daisy Irani as Mithu
 Jawahar Kaul as Advocate Ramesh
 Shyama as Tara
 Raja Gosavi as Rajan
 Nalini Chonkar as Mangala
 Jagdeep as Baldev "Billu"
 Durga Khote as Ratanlal's Aunty
 Om Prakash as Lata's Brother-in-law
 Manorama as Lata's Sister-in-law
 Bipin Gupta as Advocate Motilal
 Shivraj as Munshiram
 Anwar Hussain as Jeevan
 Agha as Champaklal
 Bhagwan Dada as Stage Actor

Soundtrack 
Lyrics written by Rajendra Krishan.

Awards and nominations

|-
| 1958
| Nanda
| Filmfare Award for Best Supporting Actress
| 
|}

References

External links
 
 Songs of Bhabhi
 Bhabhi, a Synopsis

1957 films
1950s Hindi-language films
1957 drama films
Films directed by Krishnan–Panju
Films scored by Chitragupta
Hindi remakes of Bengali films
Indian drama films
Hindi-language drama films